Platforming may refer to:
 A catalytic reforming process
 The mechanics of a platform game

See also
 Deplatforming, an administrative or political action to deny access to a platform to express opinions
 Platform (disambiguation)